Sirmais (feminine: Sirmā) is a Latvian] surname, derived from the Latvian word for "gray" (sirms). Individuals with the surname include:

 Justs Sirmais (born 1995), Latvian singer
 Mārtiņš Sirmais (born 1982), Latvian orienteering competitor
 Zigismunds Sirmais (born 1992), Latvian javelin thrower

Latvian-language masculine surnames